Pell City High School is the only public high school serving the Pell City School system. The school has approx. 1,813 students in grades 9-12 and just recently finished adding on a $7.5 million multi-purpose building which houses a 2200-seat sports arena as well as a 400-seat theatre. The school offers an advanced diploma track that allows students to take honors classes in math, and the sciences, and honors or AP classes in English, Chemistry, and History. The school partners with the local community college to allow some students to take freshman college courses half a school day or at night.

Sports 
The Pell City School colors are black and gold and their mascot is a black panther. The Panthers participate in 6A level sports and are one of the smallest schools in the division. The Panthers field teams in band, football, men's and women's tennis, men's and women's soccer, men's and women's basketball, baseball, softball, men's and women's golf, outdoor track, cross country, bass fishing, women's volleyball and cheerleading.

Facilities 
The football and soccer teams all play at Pete Rich Stadium and the band performs their halftime show during football games there as well. The volleyball and basketball teams all play in the gymnasium located in the Center for Education and Performing Arts, more commonly referred to as the CEPA. The Baseball and Softball teams both have their own fields located behind the Jr. High School, and the golf teams play at the Pell City Country Club.

Clubs 
Pell City High School offers many after and during school clubs. Clubs include First Priority, JROTC, FFA, National Beta Club, Key Club, S.A.D.D (Students against Destructive Decisions), FBLA, Skills USA, FCCLA, Scholars Bowl, SGA, FTA, Pelmel yearbook staff, and the school newspaper called the Panther Paw.

Music 
Pell City High School has a growing music program. The bands consist of a jazz band, percussion ensemble, concert band, symphonic wind ensemble, and a marching band. The marching band's name is the Pell City Marching Band of Gold. The "Marching Band of Gold" regularly competes on the state band circuit. Showchoir (Showstoppers) and Concert Choir compete on the state level.

Notably, a 2022 PCHS Graduate, Tristen Gressett, made it all the way to top 11 contestants in the popular show, American Idol!

References

External links 

City of Pell City Website
Pell City High School at greatschools.org
Pell City High School Website

Public high schools in Alabama
Educational institutions established in 1912
Schools in St. Clair County, Alabama
1912 establishments in Alabama